Stettfeld is a German name.

 Stettfeld in Bavaria
 Stettfeld (Ubstadt-Weiher), part of Ubstadt-Weiher in Baden-Württemberg